Gustavo Adolfo Maldonado Muñoz is a Colombian weightlifter. He won the gold medal in the men's 81kg event at the 2022 South American Games held in Asunción, Paraguay. He also won the gold medal in the men's 81kg event at the 2022 Pan American Weightlifting Championships held in Bogotá, Colombia.

He is a two-time silver medalist at the 2022 Bolivarian Games held in Valledupar, Colombia. He competed in the men's 81kg event at the 2022 World Weightlifting Championships in Bogotá, Colombia.

Achievements

References

External links 
 

Living people
Year of birth missing (living people)
Colombian male weightlifters
Pan American Weightlifting Championships medalists
South American Games gold medalists for Colombia
South American Games medalists in weightlifting
Competitors at the 2018 South American Games
Competitors at the 2022 South American Games
21st-century Colombian people